Kristopher Aiken (born August 24, 1978) was a Canadian football safety who played for the Toronto Argonauts of the Canadian Football League. He played in 14 regular season games from 2004 to 2005, recording eight tackles. Aiken is a Grey Cup champion after winning the 92nd Grey Cup with the Argonauts in 2004.

References 

1978 births
Living people
Canadian football defensive backs
Western Mustangs football players
Toronto Argonauts players
Players of Canadian football from Quebec
Canadian football people from Montreal